Pinapadu is a suburb in Tenali, Guntur district of the Indian state of Andhra Pradesh. It is located in Tenali mandal of Tenali revenue division. It is one of the important residential area in Tenali. The Major part of Pinapadu was in located in Chenchupeta, Tenali which one of the commercial big residential area of Tenali. railway station is located at a distance of just 7 km to Pinapadu.

Demographics 
 census, Pinapadu (rural) had a population of 1,908. The total population constitute, 940 males and 968 females —a sex ratio of 1030 females per 1000 males. 173 children are in the age group of 0–6 years, of which 79 are boys and 94 are girls. The average literacy rate stands at 79.60% with 1,381 literates.

Government and politics 
Pinapadu gram panchayat is the local self-government of the village. It is divided into wards and each ward is represented by an elected ward member. The ward members are headed by a Sarpanch. It forms a part of Andhra Pradesh Capital Region.

See also 
Villages in Tenali mandal

References 

Villages in Guntur district